The Children of Willesden Lane is a memoir by Mona Golabek, documenting the life of her mother, Lisa, from the time she left Vienna, Austria to the end of World War II. It has been adapted into a film and an organization  formed in honor of the book, that is dedicated to empowering people with the arts

Plot 
Lisa Jura was a prodigy who hoped to become a pianist during pre-World War II Vienna. As Nazi attacks on Jews continue in her home country, her parents send her on the Kindertransport to London, England. Several days after arrival, she became a servant at a manor. Sometime later, though, she leaves the manor. Lisa then resides in a hostel for Jewish children on Willesden Lane, where she makes new friends. Continuing her interest in piano, she plays music, inspiring the other children through their problems. It's a story of kindness and love and compassion.

Reception 
Joanna H. Kraus from Common Sense Media rated The Children of Willesden Lane five stars. BookTrust described the book as "eye-opening".

Awards 
The children's edition is a 2018 Sydney Taylor Book Award Notable Book for Older Readers.

Adaptations 
A theater adaptation of the book, The Pianist of Willesden Lane, was adapted and directed by Hershey Felder.

BBC Films and Empire of the Sun producer Robert Shapiro produced a movie version of the book released in 2016.

Legacy 
The Hold On To Your Music Foundation has been created in honor of Lisa Jura. Its goal is to raise awareness of how arts can empower people through adversity.

References

External links 
Hold on to your Music Foundation official website

Memoirs
Memoirs adapted into films
World War II memoirs